Gerrit Smith Miller (January 30, 1845 – March 10, 1937) was a grandson of and named for the famous abolitionist, businessman, and philanthropist Gerrit Smith. His parents were Smith's daughter, Elizabeth Smith Miller, and her husband Charles Dudley Miller. He grew up on the family's estate in Peterboro, New York, helping his grandfather by hiding escaped slaves in a barn or attic. Starting in October 1860 he attended the school of Epes Sargent Dixwell in Boston, and in 1867 married Dixwell's daughter Susan Hunt Dixwell. (Justice Oliver Wendell Holmes, Jr., married a sister.) He enrolled in Harvard in 1865, but set back by health problems, left before graduating; in 1924 the university awarded him a honorary Master of Arts degree.

Because of his contribution as founder of the Oneida Football Club (the first organised team of any form of football in the United States), Smith Miller was regarded as "the father of football in the U.S."

Overview 

Miller was primarily an importer and breeder of Holstein-Friesian cattle. His was the first herd of Holsteins in the country, according to a 1929 souvenir program of a Holstein field day and picnic, held at his farm. In Madison County, New York, where Peterboro is located, there were in 1931 more Holstein cattle than in any other county in the country, and more than in most states. More than half of the milk consumed in the United States came from this breed.

He was the founder of the Oneida Football Club of Boston, in 1862, which is regarded as the first organised team to play any form of football in the United States. Because of this, there was in the late 1940s talk of hosting a national football hall of fame in Cazenovia.) He subsequently played on Harvard's baseball team, and was known later in Cazenovia and Peterboro as "the best base ball player in this part of the country,” according to the page on him in the baseball history section of the National Baseball Hall of Fame.

He was a member of the New York State Assembly in 1880.

He was the donor of land and otherwise supported the George Junior Republic at Freeville, New York, of which he was a trustee from 1897 to 1907.

Miller's health failed after the burning on March 2, 1936, of his home, built by his great-grandfather, Peter Smith, in 1803. He died a year later. Fortunately, Miller had already, in 1928, given to the Syracuse University Libraries his grandfather's huge collection of correspondence, business records, daybooks, and pamphlets. Some of his own papers were destroyed in the fire.

He and his wife had three sons, of whom two reached adulthood: Gerrit Smith Miller Jr., a renowned zoologist, and Basil Dixwell Miller.

References

Further reading

 
 
 
 
People from Peterboro, New York
History of American football
Farmers from New York (state)
Members of the New York General Assembly
Baseball players from New York (state)
19th-century players of American football
Players of American football from New York (state)
Gerrit Smith
History of soccer in the United States